Dicyclophora is a genus of flowering plants belonging to the family Apiaceae.

Its native range is Iran.

Species:
 Dicyclophora persica Boiss.

References

Apioideae
Apioideae genera